Arctia cornuta is a moth of the  family Erebidae. It was described by Saldaitis, Ivinskis and Witt in 2004. It is found in the Turkestan Mountains at the Uzbekistan-Tajikistan border.

This species was formerly a member of the genus Acerbia, but was moved to Arctia along with the other species of the genera Acerbia, Pararctia, Parasemia, Platarctia, and Platyprepia.

References

Moths described in 2004
Arctiina
Moths of Asia